The 2017–18 Louisiana Tech Bulldogs basketball team represented Louisiana Tech University during the 2017–18 NCAA Division I men's basketball season. The Bulldogs, led by third-year head coach Eric Konkol, played their home games at the Thomas Assembly Center in Ruston, Louisiana as members of Conference USA. They finished the season 17–16, 7–11 in C-USA play to finish in a tie for ninth place. As the No. 10 seed in the C-USA tournament, they defeated North Texas before losing to Old Dominion in the quarterfinals.

Previous season 
The Bulldogs finished the 2016–17 season 23–10, 14–4 in C-USA play to finish in second place. They beat UAB in the quarterfinals of the C-USA Tournament before losing to Marshall in the semifinals. Despite finishing with 23 wins, the school declined to participate in a postseason tournament marking the first time since 2013 that they did not participate in a postseason tournament.

Offseason

Departures

Incoming Transfers

Recruiting class of 2017

Roster

Schedule and results

|-
!colspan=9 style=|Non-conference regular season

|-
!colspan=12 style=| Conference USA regular season

|-
!colspan=9 style=| Conference USA tournament

References

Louisiana Tech Bulldogs basketball seasons
Louisiana Tech
Louisiana Tech Bulldogs men's b
Louisiana Tech Bulldogs men's b